Y Điêng (born 1928) is an Ê Đê author and ethnographer from Sông Hinh District, Phú Yên Province, Vietnam. As a young man he joined the fight against the French for independence and subsequently worked for the Voice of Vietnam in the late 1950s. His ethnographic works such as Truyên cô Ê-đê (E De Tales) chronicle the lives of the Ê Đê people during the war against the French and explore the social mores, beliefs and lifestyles of his native community. After making the transition from recording oral folk literature to writing works of fiction, these themes also were common in his short stories and novels. Y Điêng's novels were the first to be published bilingually in Ê Đê and Vietnamese. He has won three local writing competitions and was the first Ê Đê recipient of the Vietnam State Award for Literature and Art (2007).

Works
Em chờ bộ đội Awa Hồ (1962)
Ông già Khơ Rao (1964)
Như cánh chim Kway (1974)
Hơ Giang (1978)
Drai hlinh đi về phía sáng (1985)
Truyên cô Ê-đê (1988)
Chuyện trên bờ sông Hinh (1994)

References

Living people
1928 births
Vietnamese novelists
Vietnamese male short story writers
Vietnamese short story writers
People from Phú Yên province
Rade people